Nactus heteronotus, also known as central savanna slender-toed gecko, is a species of lizard in the family Gekkonidae. It is endemic to Papua New Guinea.

References

Nactus
Reptiles of Papua New Guinea
Reptiles described in 1885
Endemic fauna of Papua New Guinea
Geckos of New Guinea